Jiný vzduch is a 1939 Czech drama film directed by Martin Frič.

Cast
 František Smolík as Frantisek Elis
 Zdeňka Baldová as Elisová Zena
 Hana Vítová as Helena
 Ladislav Boháč as Prokop
 František Kreuzmann as Emil Viták
 František Paul as Pavelka
 Bedřich Veverka as Boubela
 Vojta Novák as Professor Vácha
 Oldřich Kovár as Zpevák

References

External links
 

1939 films
1939 drama films
1930s Czech-language films
Czechoslovak black-and-white films
Films directed by Martin Frič
Czechoslovak drama films
1930s Czech films